The SsangYong WZ is a concept sedan made by the Korean manufacturer, SsangYong Motor Company. SsangYong says that 'WZ' stands for 'World Zenith'. At the vehicle's debut at the Seoul Motor Show, SsangYong stated: "The Wz packs the flagship Chairman's ultra-luxurious environment, while keeping SsangYong's excellence in design and engineering. Wz enters into a new field, parting from its traditional SUV designs, and emphasizes SsangYong's excellence in luxury." Features include: climate control, cruise control, airbags, Independent rear suspension, and ABS Brakes.

References

External links

SsangYong WZ on Edmunds
SsangYong WZ on Autoblog

WZ